David Nepomuceno (May 9, 1900 – September 27, 1939) was the first Filipino to compete in the Olympics. He was a runner and the sole representative of the Philippines at the 1924 Summer Olympics in Paris, France. Nepomuceno, also served as a sailor in the United States Navy. In 1925, Nepomuceno ran the 100 meters in only two-tenths of a second short of the then-world record.

Early athletic career
Nepomuceno specialized in 100 meter sprints. Along with fellow Filipino Fortunato Catalon, he was considered a world-class sprinter in the 1920s, competing frequently in the Far East.

The Olympics
When the Philippines joined the International Olympic Committee in 1918, the requisite for the country's acceptance was the participation of a Filipino athlete at the 1924 Olympic Games in Paris, France. Nepomuceno was the sole participant representing the Philippines. At the Olympics, he ran the 100-meter and 200-meter dashes; in neither race was he fast enough to qualify for the quarterfinals.

Far Eastern Games
Nepomuceno won the following medals at the Far Eastern Games:

1925
 Gold Medal, 200 meter straight dash
 Silver Medal, 100 meter dash

1927
 Gold Medal, 100 meter dash
 Bronze Medal, 200 meter straight dash

References

External links
 

1900 births
1939 deaths
Sportspeople from Albay
American military personnel of Filipino descent
Athletes (track and field) at the 1924 Summer Olympics
Filipino male sprinters
Olympic track and field athletes of the Philippines